Heterogynis paradoxa is a moth in the Heterogynidae family. It was described by Jules Pierre Rambur in 1837.

References

Heterogynidae
Moths described in 1837